Negotiations and Love Songs is a compilation album of songs by American singer-songwriter Paul Simon, released in 1988 by Warner Bros. Records. It consists of songs released from 1971 to 1986. The title of the compilation is taken from a line in the song "Train in the Distance".

Track listing

 "Graceland" appears only on the LP edition of the album.

Personnel
Paul Simon – vocals, guitar (tracks 2–6, 11, 15), acoustic guitar (tracks 8, 12), background vocals (tracks 10, 16–17), electric guitar (track 14), six-string electric bass (track 16)

Additional musicians
Huk Brown – lead guitar (track 1)
Wallace Wilson – rhythm guitar (track 1)
Neville Hinds – organ (track 1)
Jackie Jackson – bass guitar (track 1)
Winston Grennan – drums (track 1)
Denzil Laing – percussion (track 1)
Larry Knechtel – piano (track 1)
Cissy Houston – singer (track 1)
Renelle Stafford – singer (track 1)
Deirdre Tuck – singer (track 1)
Von Eva Sims – singer (track 1)
David Spinoza – guitar (tracks 2–3)
Airto Moreira – percussion (tracks 2, 12–13)
Russel George – bass guitar (track 2)
Alexander Gafa – guitar (track 3)
Bob Cranshaw – electric bass (track 3)
Richard Davis – acoustic bass (track 3)
Grady Tate – drums (track 3)
Bobby James – keyboard (track 3)
Bobby Scott – piano (track 3)
Don Elliot – vibes (track 3)
Pete Carr – electric guitar (tracks 4, 6)
David Hood – bass guitar (tracks 4–6, 9)
Roger Hawkins – percussion (tracks 4–6, 9)
Barry Beckett – keyboard, vibes (tracks 4, 6), electric piano (track 9)
The Dixie Hummingbirds – vocal group (track 5)
Jimmy Johnson – electric guitar (track 6)
Bob James – electric piano (track 7)
Hugh McCracken – electric guitar (tracks 7–8, 10)
Joe Beck – electric guitar (track 7)
Tony Levin – bass guitar (tracks 7–8, 10)
Steve Gadd – drums (tracks 7–8, 10–12)
Ralph McDonald – percussion (tracks 7–8, 10–11, 16)
Phil Woods – saxophone solo (track 7)
Valerie Simpson – background vocals (tracks 7–8)
Ken Asher – organ (track 8)
John Tropea – electric guitar (track 8)
Pheobe Snow – vocal background (track 8) 
Patti Austin – vocal background (track 8)
Mike Brecker – saxophone solo (track 9)
Eric Gale – electric guitar (track 10)
Anthony Jackson – percussion (track 11), contrabass guitar (track 12–14)
Richard Tee – piano (track 11), Fender Rhodes (track 12–14)
The Oak Ridge Boys – vocal group (track 11)
Dean Parks – hi-string guitar (tracks 12–13)
Michael Mainieri – vibes (tracks 12–13), marimba (track 12)
Marcus Miller – bass guitar (track 13)
Jeff Porcaro – drums (track 13)
Jess Levy – cello (track 13)
Peter Gordon – French horn (track 13)
Mark Rivera – alto sax (track 13)
Rob Sabino – piano (track 14)
Wells Christie – Synclavier (track 14)
The Harptones – background vocals (track 14)
Chikapa "Ray" Phiri – guitar (tracks 15–17)
Bakithi Kumalo – bass guitar (tracks 15–17)
Isaac Misthali – drums (tracks 15–16)
Youssou N'Dour – percussion (track 15)
Babacar Faye – percussion (track 15)
Assane Thiam – percussion (track 15)
Earl Gardner – trumpet (track 15)
Leonard Pickett – tenor sax (track 15)
Alex Foster – alto sax (track 15)
Ladysmith Black Mambazo – vocals (track 15)
Rob Mounsey – synthesizer (track 16)
Adrian Belew – guitar synthesizer (track 16)
Ronald E. Cuber – bass sax (track 16), baritone sax (track 16)
John Faddis – trumpet (track 16)
Ronald E. Brecker – trumpet (track 16)
Lewis Michael Soloff – trumpet (track 16)
Alan Rubin – trumpet (track 16)
David W. Bargeron – trombone (track 16)
Kim Allan Cissel – trombone (track 16)
Morris Goldberg – pennywhistle solo (track 16)
Vusi Khumalo – drums (track 17)
Makhaya Mahlangu – percussion (track 17)
Demola Adepoju – pedal steel guitar (track 17)
The Everly Brothers – vocals (track 17)

Technical
Paul Simon – co-producer (tracks 1–14), producer (tracks 15–17), co-arrangements (track 16)
Russ Titelman – co-producer (tracks 12–14)
Roy Halee – co-producer (tracks 1–2, 12–14), compilation assembler
Phil Ramone – co-producer (tracks 3, 5, 7–11)
Muscle Shoals Rhythm Section – co-producer (4–6)
Quincy Jones – string arrangements (track 3)
Dave Mathews – horn arrangements (track 7)
Bob James – woodwind and string arrangements (track 9)
Dave Grusin – horn arrangements (track 10)
The Harptones – background vocal arrangements (track 14)
George Delerue – orchestration (track 14)
Chikapa "Ray" Phiri – co-arrangements (track 16)
Greg Calbi – mastering
Robert Mapplethorpe – front cover photo

Charts

Weekly charts

Year-end charts

Certifications

Notes

Paul Simon compilation albums
1988 greatest hits albums
Albums produced by Phil Ramone
Albums produced by Roy Halee
Warner Records compilation albums
Albums produced by Paul Simon